Johann Karl Ludwig Schorn, after 1838 von Schorn (10 June 1793, Castell - 17 February 1842, Weimar) was a German art historian and university Professor. His second wife was the poet, .

Biography 
From 1811 to 1814, he studied evangelical theology  at the Friedrich-Alexander-Universität in Erlangen. After graduating, he moved to Munich, where he came under the influence of the intellectual circle associated with Friedrich Thiersch; developing an interest in art history and archaeology.

In 1818 he published his first work, Über die Studien der griechischen Künstler (On the studies of Greek artists), which attracted the attention of the art collector and historian, Sulpiz Boisserée. The following year, Boisserée recommended him to the publisher, Johann Friedrich Cotta, who entrusted him with editing the Kunstblatt (Art sheet), a supplement to the Morgenblatt für gebildete Stände of  Stuttgart. It soon became Germany's leading art journal. Schorn was able to attract numerous well known contributors, including Carl Friedrich von Rumohr, Karl Otfried Müller, Johann David Passavant, Johann Gottlob von Quandt, Franz Theodor Kugler, Gustav Friedrich Waagen und Karl Schnaase.

In 1826, he married Johanna Voigt, daughter of the mathematician, . That same year, he was given a professorship at the Academy of Fine Arts Munich, and the chairs of mythology and art history at Ludwig Maximilian University. In 1830, he was named an extraordinary member of the Bavarian Academy of Sciences. In 1833, Johanna and his mother both died. That, as well as continuing opposition from the painter, Peter von Cornelius (and his followers in the Nazarene movement), led him to accept an offer from Charles Frederick, Grand Duke of Saxe-Weimar-Eisenach, to become the new Director of the Weimar Princely Free Drawing School. 

He was awarded the Order of the Crown in 1838, which gave him the right to use the noble prefix "von". In 1839, he became a Privy Councillor and was named a Knight in the Order of the White Falcon. That same year, he married  Henriette Wilhelmine Auguste Freiin von Stein, one of the courtiers of the Grand Duchess Maria. Their daughter, the writer , was born in 1841.

He died the following year, from complications related to gout.

Sources

External links 

1793 births
1842 deaths
German art historians
German art critics
Academic staff of the Academy of Fine Arts, Munich
People from Kitzingen (district)